Islands, such as the British Isles, can be adversely affected by the introduction of non-native species. Often an island will have several distinct species not present on the nearest mainland, and vice versa. The native flora and fauna of islands which have been isolated for a longer period of time such as New Zealand or Hawaii (which have been isolated for millions of years) are more vulnerable than islands such as Great Britain and Ireland, which became isolated more recently (8,000 years ago at the end of the Last Glacial Period).

Many species have been introduced to Britain during historical times. Some species such as the midwife toad (Alytes), rainbow trout (Oncorhynchus mykiss), sweet chestnut (Castanea sativa) and horseradish (Armoracia rusticana) have been introduced with few adverse consequences. However, others such as the grey squirrel (Sciurus carolinensis), signal crayfish (Pacifastacus leniusculus), and Japanese knotweed (Fallopia japonica) have had a severe impact both economically and ecologically.

Problems caused

Economics
In 2010 CABI (Centre for Agricultural Bioscience International) estimated that introduced species in United Kingdom cost £2 billion annually. The most costly species were listed as being the European rabbit and Japanese knotweed. The European rabbit, introduced to Britain by the Romans in 1AD, eats and therefore damages a wide variety of crops and cost the UK £263 million. Japanese knotweed, introduced as an ornamental garden plant in the late 19th century, the roots of which spread by underground rhizomes, can undermine and damage buildings, pavements and roads, cost £179 million. In fact, most mortgage lenders in the UK will demand proof of the plant's eradication from a home owner's property (if signs of it being present are noticed), for it can cause potential physical damage to one's estate.

Ecology

Displacement of native species
In addition to the economic costs incurred by management, some introduced fauna displace native species. This can occur by predation, competition for resources, or the spread of disease.

Predation: American mink (Neogale vison), which either escaped or were released from fur farms, prey on native European water voles (Arvicola amphibius) and are drastically reducing their numbers. It was reported that since the late 1980s, 90% of the UK population of the European water vole has been lost, primarily due to displacement and predation by the American mink.

Resource competition: The introduced grey squirrel is larger and more aggressive than the native red squirrel (Sciurus vulgaris) and displaces the native squirrel by competing for food and habitat. Rose-ringed parakeet (Psittacula krameri) populations, originally an Afro-Asian parakeet, have become established in Britain from introduced and escaped birds. There are two main populations: the largest is based around south London, where they can be regularly seen in places such as Battersea Park, Richmond Park, and Greenwich Park; the smaller population can be seen in Surrey and Berkshire, and by 2005 consisted of many thousands of birds, known as the Kingston parakeets. These large parakeets displace native birds species by competing for roosts and nest sites.

Disease: Some introduced species carry diseases to which native species are susceptible. The grey squirrel is a carrier of the squirrel pox virus which kills red squirrels but not grey squirrels. The European crayfish is susceptible to crayfish plague which is spread by the introduced signal crayfish.

Unlike some other environmental problems such as pollution, the effect of an introduced species is not a single event. Once a species has been introduced to an island, the problems may persist and escalate as the species spreads further.

Environmental damage
Coypus (Myocastor coypus), large semi-aquatic rodents native to South America, were introduced to the British Isles in 1929 when fur farms were set up in Sussex, Hampshire, Devon and Norfolk. The farms were sited mainly in lowland areas rich in rivers and streams. During the 1930s coypus escaped from captivity and despite repeated attempts to control them, they adapted well to the British habitat, breeding successfully in the countryside of East Anglia. Their habit of building large burrows in river banks caused great erosion damage and threatened the tourism industry where boating is a popular recreation, and caused great damage to drainage works. Coypu were declared to have been successfully eradicated in December 1989,. but in 2012 a "giant rat" was killed in County Durham, and authorities suspected that the animal was, in fact, a coypu.

Management of introduced species
Some species have adapted harmoniously into the ecology of the British Isles. For example, the little owl is not native to the British Isles but was first introduced in 1842, by Thomas Powys and is now naturalised there. However, the presence of some introduced species has proved disastrous for native flora and fauna. There is often a link between how well a species can integrate with an existing ecosystem, and the distance from their local range; i.e. species sourced closer to the sink site tend to cause less damage.

Case studies of impact examples can be found at the Non-native Species Secretariat website.

Information on control methods for aquatic species can be found at the GB Non-native Species Secretariat website.

Example: grey squirrel
One notable example of a species introduced to the British Isles is the grey squirrel from North America, which out-competes the smaller native red squirrel, as well as carrying a virus that is fatal to the reds. The cost of attempting eradication was reported in 2010 to be £14 million. These attempts have been deemed unsuccessful and priority is now being given to preserving the remaining red squirrel habitats.

The following is a partial list of introduced species.  Species marked with a dagger (†) are controlled by The Invasive Alien Species (Enforcement and Permitting) Order 2019, which is the latest legislation.

Vertebrates

Mammals
 Red-necked wallaby from Australia
 American mink
 Black rat
 Brown rat
 House mouse
 Chinese water deer
 Coypu from South America (subsequently eradicated)
 Feral cat from the Middle East
 Edible dormouse from Europe
 European rabbit from Continental Europe
 Grey squirrel† from North America
 Fallow deer from Continental Europe
 Feral goat
 Reeves's muntjac† deer from China
 Sika deer from Asia

Birds

 Canada goose
 Common pheasant
 Golden pheasant from Asia
 Silver pheasant
 Indian Peafowl
 Rose-ringed parakeet (Kingston parakeets) from Asia, see Feral parakeets in Great Britain
 Lady Amherst's pheasant – extinct in GB since 2015
 Little owl from mainland Europe
 Mandarin duck from Asia
 Red-legged partridge
 Ruddy duck†  from America
 Egyptian goose†  from Africa

Reptiles
 Aesculapian snake
 Common wall lizard
 Western green lizard
 European pond terrapin
 22 species of terrapin especially slider†

Amphibians
 Alpine newt
 American bullfrog (not established)
 Edible frog
 European tree frog
 Marsh frog
 Pool frog (southern clade alien; northern clade reintroduced)
 Midwife toad
 Yellow-bellied toad

Fish

 Bitterling
 Black bullhead
 Bluegill
 Brook trout
 Common carp
 Fathead minnow
 Goldfish
 Grass carp
 Orfe
 Pacific humped back salmon
 Pumpkinseed
 Rainbow trout
 Sunbleak
 Topmouth gudgeon
 Walleye
 Wels
 Zander

Invertebrates

Molluscs
 New Zealand mud snail (Potamopyrgus antipodarum)
 Spanish slug (Arion vulgaris)
 Zebra mussel (Dreissena polymorpha), invasive

Crustaceans
 Chinese mitten crab†
 Killer shrimp
 Red swamp crayfish†
 Signal crayfish†
 Spiny-cheek crayfish†

Insects

Ants
 Pharaoh ant from the United States
 List of non-endemic ant species introduced to Great Britain

Beetles
 Harlequin ladybird
 Citrus long-horned beetle (Anoplophora chinensis) invasive

Butterflies and moths
 Large chequered skipper butterfly from continental Europe to Channel Islands (subsequently lost)
 Large copper butterfly (Lycaena dispar rutilus) from Continental Europe (subsequently lost)
 Large copper butterfly (Lycaena dispar batavus) from The Netherlands (subsequently lost)
 Geranium bronze butterfly from South Africa via Southern Europe on geranium (not established)
 Map butterfly (subsequently eradicated)
 Psychoides filicivora moth from the Far East
 Azalea leaf miner moth from east Asia
 Argyresthia cupressella moth from United States
 Brown house moth from Asia
 Tachystola acroxantha moth from Australia
 Coleotechnites piceaella moth from United States
 Cotoneaster webworm moth from United States
 Blastobasis adustella moth
 Blastobasis lacticolella moth
 Adoxophyes orana summer fruit tortrix moth
 Carnation tortrix
 Light brown apple moth (Epiphyas postvittana) from Australia
 Codling moth
 Horse-chestnut leaf miner
 Box tree moth (Cydalima perspectalis) from east Asia
 Common forest looper (Pseudocoremia suavis) a New Zealand endemic found west Cornwall in 2007, possibly not established.
 Oak processionary moth (Thaumetopoea processionea)
 Musotima nitidalis, from Australia and New Zealand and first found in Dorset in 2009. It has since spread across southern England to Essex and is thought to have been originally imported with tree ferns.

Planarians
Two species that prey on earthworms:
 Arthurdendyus triangulatus - from New Zealand
 Australoplana sanguinea - from Australia

Stick insects 

 Unarmed stick insect (Acanthoxyla inermis) from New Zealand
 Prickly stick insect (Acanthoxyla prasina) from New Zealand

Termites
 Reticulitermes grassei - identified in 1994 in Saunton, Devon. Declared eradicated in 2021

Arachnids
 Redback spider from Australia - recorded but without evidence of a breeding population
 Wasp spider from northern Europe
 Euscorpius flavicaudis (European yellow-tailed scorpion) invasive; probably originating from Italy; there is a thriving colony in Kent
 Steatoda nobilis (noble false widow) - thought to originate from Madeira and the Canary Islands.

Plants

 American skunk-cabbage
 American willow herb
 Autumnal crocus
 Bermuda buttercup
 Canadian pond weed
 Common field speedwell
 Cotoneaster
 Curly waterweed†
 Epilobium brunnescens
 Evening primrose
 Fanwort†
 Floating pennywort†
 Floating water primrose†
 Fox and cubs
 Giant hogweed†
 Giant rhubarb† 
 Guernsey fleabane
 Himalayan balsam†
 Hottentot fig
 Japanese knotweed
 Jewelweed
 Least duckweed
 Leycesteria formosa
 Nuttall's waterweed†
 Oxford ragwort
 Parrot's feather†
 Pigmy weed
 Piri-piri burr
 Purple dewplant
 Purple pitcher
 Rhododendron
 Russian vine
 Spanish bluebell
 Water fern
 Water hyacinth†
 Water primrose†
 White butterbur
 Myriophyllum verticillatum, whorled water milfoil, invasive to Ireland

See also
List of invasive non-native species in England and Wales
List of introduced species
Lists of invasive species
Invasive species in Australia
Invasive species in New Zealand

Resources
GB Non-native Species Secretariat
Scottish Invasive Species Initiative

References

Lists of biota of the British Isles
British Isles